Tajov is a village and municipality in Banská Bystrica District in the Banská Bystrica Region of central Slovakia.

History
In historical records the village was first mentioned in 1495.

Geography
The municipality lies at an altitude of 464 metres and covers an area of 9.289 km². It is situated on outskirts of Banská Bystrica, under the Kremnica Mountains. The village has a population of about 592 people.

Famous people
 Vratislav Greško, football player
 Jozef Murgaš, inventor, pioneer of radiotelegraphy
 Jozef Gregor-Tajovský, writer and playwright

References

External links
 
 

Villages and municipalities in Banská Bystrica District